A City Sparrow is a 1920 American silent drama film directed by Sam Wood and written by Kate Jordan and Clara Genevieve Kennedy. The film stars Ethel Clayton, Walter Hiers, Clyde Fillmore, Lillian Leighton, William Boyd, and Rose Cade. The film was released on October 17, 1920, by Paramount Pictures.

Plot
As summarized in a film magazine, Milly West (Ethel Clayton), a cabaret dancer becomes injured, and after a surgeon says she cannot become a mother, she gives up on love. Tim (Walter Hiers) loves her and after she rejects him, writes his mother in the country that he has killed himself. David (Clyde Fillmore), a man from the country, takes her there to recover and later wins her over.

The magazine also used stills to illustrate the plot:

Cast
Ethel Clayton as Milly West
Walter Hiers as Tim Ennis
Clyde Fillmore as David Muir
Lillian Leighton as Ma Ennis
William Boyd as Hughie Ray
Rose Cade as Annie
Robert Brower as Parson Neil
Helen Jerome Eddy as Hester Neil
Sylvia Ashton as Mrs. Babb

Preservation status
Currently a lost film.

References

External links 

 

1920 films
1920s English-language films
Silent American drama films
1920 drama films
Paramount Pictures films
Films directed by Sam Wood
American black-and-white films
American silent feature films
1920s American films